Albert Montañés was the defending champion, but lost to Ernests Gulbis in the semifinals.  Gulbis went on to win the title, defeating Federico Delbonis in the final, 6–1, 7–6(7–5).

Seeds
The top four seeds receive a bye into the second round. 

 John Isner (quarterfinals)
 Ernests Gulbis (champion)
 Gaël Monfils (withdrew)
 Gilles Simon (semifinals)
 Dmitry Tursunov (quarterfinals)
 Nicolas Mahut (second round)
 Federico Delbonis (final)
 Édouard Roger-Vasselin (second round)

Draw

Finals

Top half

Bottom half

Qualifying

Seeds

Qualifiers

Lucky losers
  Sam Querrey

Qualifying draw

First qualifier

Second qualifier

Third qualifier

Fourth qualifier

External links
 Main draw
 Qualifying draw

Singles